Elisa Mörzinger (born 6 May 1997) is an Austrian World Cup alpine ski racer. Mörzinger focuses on the technical events of slalom and giant slalom.

Career
In October 2019, Mörzinger made her World Cup debut in the Giant Slalom at Sölden, Austria. In January 2020, she scored her first World Cup points and achieved her first podium in the Parallel Giant Slalom in Sestriere, Italy.

World Cup results

Season standings

Race podiums
 1 podium (1 PGS)

References

External links

1997 births
Living people
Austrian female alpine skiers
20th-century Austrian women
21st-century Austrian women